Population Health Management is a bimonthly peer-reviewed public health journal covering the study of population health, and how it can be improved by improving health care services. It was established in 1998 as Disease Management, obtaining its current name in 2008; the journal's first issue under its current name was published in August 2008. It is published by Mary Ann Liebert, Inc. and the editor-in-chief is David B. Nash (Thomas Jefferson University). According to the Journal Citation Reports, the journal has a 2020 impact factor of 2.459.

References

External links

Public health journals
Mary Ann Liebert academic journals
Bimonthly journals
Publications established in 1998
English-language journals